Free Willy is an animated television series, inspired by the 1993 film of the same name. This television show was produced by Warner Bros. Television, Regency Enterprises, and the Canadian company Nelvana for Warner Bros. Studios.

The show continues the adventures of the killer whale Willy and Jesse, the boy who freed him from captivity as shown in the film. In retrospect, the series also anticipates multiple plot elements of the film sequel, Free Willy 2: The Adventure Home, released the following summer. The overarching conflict is reminiscent of Moby-Dick: a powerful oil baron, known to the main characters only as a cyborg called "The Machine" until the final episodes, loses his arm and part of his face to Willy while committing an environmental atrocity and wants revenge upon "that rotten whale... and his boy". The show aired on ABC.

Plot
Jesse has been adopted by his foster parents, the Greenwoods, and they have moved from Seattle to the Pacific coast. He is given a job at the Misty Island Oceanic Reserve, a local wildlife rescue and research institute where Randolph, his Native American mentor from the movie, now works. In the first episode, Jesse discovers he has the ability to talk to animals and understand their speech; Randolph, a Haida, explains that he is a Truth Talker. This revelation allows for Willy and the other sea creatures featured in the show to have full personalities and more prominent roles in key plot events. Jesse and Randolph work with Mr. Naugle, the head biologist, and Marlene, a research assistant, who are studying Einstein, a dolphin, and Lucille, a seal, teaching them behavioral communication with normal humans.

The main villain of the series, similar in personality to Captain Ahab, is a cyborg called "The Machine" who holds Willy responsible for his loss of an arm and part of his face. It was initially implied that Willy had bitten them off, but a flashback revealed that his submarine was destroyed upon encountering Willy, hurling him into another ship's screw propeller. His appearance recalls Locutus of Borg and the Phantom of the Opera. When not using his new submarine to create environmental havoc, he dons a mask and glove (perhaps a nod to the contributions of Michael Jackson to the films) for disguise and continues to run an oil company under his former identity, Rockland Stone.

Early in the series, The Machine jettisons his ship's skipper, a rather nervous fellow by the name of Captain Frye, revealing he has created, à la Frankenstein, four green, slimy, synthetic henchmen called Amphonids from inanimate toxic waste. They mainly function as comic relief, oddly reluctant to carry out instructions to pollute and destroy the environment, preferring to slouch around and entertain themselves, and often making costly and catastrophic errors for The Machine.
 
Throughout the series, Jesse is constantly fighting plots and schemes hatched by The Machine to destroy Willy, such as releasing deadly parasitism and creating genetic engineering giant squid predatory to orca, and to despoil the ecosystem, such as wanton spilling of garbage, toxic waste and oil into the sea. Meanwhile, he attempts to influence the ostensibly reasonable business magnate Mr. Stone to adopt environmentally friendly industrial practices through his publicist, P. R. Frickey.

Toward the end of the first season, Jesse starts suspecting that Rockland Stone is The Machine who faces him trying to wipe out the salmon streams in Misty Island's inland rivers ("Milestones"). In the final episode ("Ghost Ship") Jesse and Willy come across a half sunken ship that has something to do with The Machine's past and the Stone Cooperation. Frustrated in figuring out if Rockland Stone is the villain that he and Willy have been fighting against, Jesse unmasks The Machine before the public (which in his Stone identity is running for senator) and escapes a close encounter from him while trying to find evidence. The next day of the senator election, Jesse and Willy go and gather video tape evidence of the ship (which is full of war material) and The Machine tries to get rid of the ship with the use of explosives. In the end, "Stone" loses the election thanks to Jesse's video tape showing what the ship was carrying which was shown to the public through media coverage and Jesse and Willy celebrate his defeat afterwards.

While the first season centers mostly around Willy and Jesse's adventures at the Misty Island Oceanic Reserve, the second season takes them to the Arctic with eco-activist Ben Shore. They discover an untouched paradise island with various healthful benefits ("Paradise Found") and are greeted by Arktos, a bear who claims Jesse is the "protector" of the island, and other talking animals. The Machine follows and attempts to industrialize the island, destroying its natural beauty and benefit to the ecosystem. Ben heroically demolishes the passageway to the island after Jesse and Willy escape, thwarting The Machine, but injuring and trapping himself. The healing effects of the island restore Ben's health and he lives happily in his environmental utopia, having given Jesse a carved eagle necklace as a keepsake to carry on his work. In the second to last episode of the season ("Turmoil"), Jesse, Willy and the Eco Ranger crew meet up with Marlene's former teacher, the balding chemist Dr. Elliot who has created a special formula called oil solidification to help stop future oil spills. The Machine hears about this new formula and has plans in mind. He kidnaps Dr. Elliot and causes a massive intentional oil spill to suffocate Willy and other sea life. He also impersonates Dr. Elliot (using a different disguise) and influences the public in giving a one million dollar donation for cleanup efforts. Jesse and Willy were able to see through the disguise, rescue Dr. Elliot, prevent the fraudulent donation and stop the oil with the formula. Upon returning to Misty Island, Jesse and Willy become entwined in a Christmastime plot ("Yuletide or Redtide") to use a biodegradable jet ski (assumed to be a gift from his parents, Glen and Annie, but actually from Stone) for the release of deadly red tide to thrive in the unseasonably warm water, implied to be an effect of climate change. Unchecked, the microorganism would simultaneously destroy Willy, the ecosystem and Jesse's reputation. When The Machine is defeated by teamwork and a sudden cold spell, saving everyone's good cheer, the Amphonids make themselves into a distorted Christmas tree and actually sing along with the townspeople, to their master's chagrin.

Voice cast
 Zachary Bennett as Jesse, a 12-year-old boy who was abandoned by his mother when he was a child.
 Paul Haddad as Willy, the killer whale.
 Michael Fletcher as Randolph Johnson, Willy's keeper.
 Ron Len as Glen Greenwood, Jesse's foster father.
 Sheila McCarthy as Annie Greenwood, Jesse's foster mother.

New characters:
 Neil Crone as Mr. Naugle, the head marine biology of the Misty Island Research Institute.
 Rachael Crawford as Marlene, a marine research assistant at the Misty Island Institute. 
 Geordie Johnson as Ben Shore, an eco-activist, Randolph’s old friend and Jesse's hero.
 Andrew Sabiston as P. R. Frickey, an unwitting publicist for Stone Industries.
 Gary Krawford as Rockland Stone (The Machine), the villain.
 James Kidnie as Amphonids, toxic waste blob servants of The Machine.
 Kevin Zegers as Einstein, a talking bottlenose dolphin.
 Alyson Court as Lucille, a talking California sea lion.

Series overview

Episodes

Season 1 (1994)

Season 2 (1995)

Home media
In October 2011, the first season was released through Amazon Video and iTunes, while the second season has yet to be released. The show has never received a home video release in North America, but a double box VHS of it did get released in the United Kingdom in the mid-1990s.

References

External links
 

American Broadcasting Company original programming
1990s American animated television series
1994 American television series debuts
1995 American television series endings
1990s Canadian animated television series
1994 Canadian television series debuts
1995 Canadian television series endings
American children's animated adventure television series
American children's animated fantasy television series
Canadian children's animated fantasy television series
Canadian children's animated adventure television series
Environmental television
Television series by Nelvana
Television series by Warner Bros. Animation
Television series by Warner Bros. Television Studios
Animated television series about orphans
Animated television shows based on films
Free Willy (franchise)